Tennis has been contested at every Mediterranean Games since its introduction to the program at the 1963 Mediterranean Games. The 1975 Mediterranean Games were the last games with tennis as a male only event — beginning with the 1979 Mediterranean Games, women's tennis is included in the program.

Medal table

Men's

Singles

Doubles

Women's

Singles

Doubles

Medal tables

All years
Updated after the 2022 Mediterranean Games

Players with 3 or more medals

References

External links
International Mediterranean Games Committee

 
T
Mediterranean Games
Mediterranean Games
Mediterranean Games
Mediterranean Games